Back by Unpopular Demand was a concert tour by alternative rock band The Replacements. It marks the first tour for the band since they broke up in 1991.

History
In late 2011, rumors began to circulate that The Replacements were considering to reunite. Tommy Stinson mentioned in an interview that year "if a reunion happens, it happens. If the planets align and the oceans don't swallow up the earth first.". On October 3, 2012, it was announced that The Replacements had reformed and that Westerberg and Tommy Stinson were in the studio recording an EP containing song cover versions. Titled Songs for Slim, the EP was sold in a 250-copy edition of 10" vinyl and auctioned online to benefit former bandmate Dunlap, who had suffered a stroke.

On June 13, 2013, Riot Fest announced that the Replacements would be headlining the three incarnations of the fest in Toronto, Chicago, and Denver. Dave Minehan, guitarist/vocalist of Boston-based band The Neighborhoods, and drummer Josh Freese rounded out the line-up for these shows.

Festival appearances were announced throughout 2014, including performances at Coachella, Osheaga, and Austin City Limits As well as solo headlining shows at Saint Paul's Midway Stadium and New York City's Forest Hills Stadium. The Midway Stadium concert sold out within minutes.

On February 9, 2015 the band announced a spring tour of the United States and Europe, including headlining performances at the Primavera Sound festival in Spain and Portugal on May 28 and June 5, 2015, the band's first show in Portugal. On this tour, they debuted several unreleased songs. Westerberg announced on stage in Porto that it was the group's final live performance on June 5, 2015.

Critical reception
The tour received overwhelmingly positive reviews from many critics and newsletters. Caryn Rose of Jukebox Graduate wrote "It has been so long since you heard it live, since you got to sing it next to other people who love this song as much as you do. Even if you never stopped listening to the Replacements, or caring about this music, what was missing was being in the same place with other people who felt the same way about it as you did. The audience tonight was filled with people I know or am on nodding acquaintance with from seeing them at other shows by other bands, and it's not accidental or surprising that they all converged here tonight."

Opening acts
 The Hold Steady (Saint Paul and New York City)
 Lucero (Saint Paul)
 Deer Tick (New York City)
 Descendents (Tempe)
 Switchfoot (Tempe)
 The Young Fresh Fellows (Seattle and Portland)
 John Doe (San Francisco and Los Angeles)
 together PANGEA (Los Angeles)
 Teenage Bottlerocket (Denver)
 Dinosaur Jr. (Cambridge)
 The Young Leaves (Cambridge)
 Smoking Popes (Chicago)
 Midnight Reruns (Milwaukee)
 The Silks (Detroit)
 J Roddy Walston and the Business (Washington, D.C. and Philadelphia)
 Superchunk (Philadelphia)
 Jesse Malin (Amsterdam and London)
 You Am I (London)

Tour dates

Cancelled Tour dates

References 

2014 concert tours
2015 concert tours
Reunion concert tours